Cossack Mamay (in less significant variants also named as Cossack banduryst) is a Ukrainian folkloric hero, one of the standard characters in traditional Ukrainian itinerant puppet theater, the Vertep.

Overview
Cossack Mamay is encountered in legends, folk stories and proverbs. These became widely popular after the dissolution of the Zaporizhian Sich in 1775. Cossack Mamay is one of the most common characters in Ukrainian folk painting, from the late 17th century to the present time. In the hundreds of surviving paintings, Cossack Mamay is usually shown with a kobza – a lute-like musical instrument that is the symbol of Ukrainian soul; a horse, which represented both freedom and fidelity; and an oak with his weapons hanging on it symbolizing the people's strength. The paintings from the time of Koliyivschyna sometimes portray Mamay on the background of violent incidents involving Poles or Jews.

"Cossack-Bandurist", "Cossack-Zaporozhets", "Cossack Mamai" - these are all names of paintings of the same type. The general features of the composition and the main image, their existence for several centuries in Ukrainian lands allow us to consider these works as traditional folk paintings. There are several options for them. But in all cases, the basis of the composition is always the figure of a Cossack, who mostly sits with his legs crossed.

The largest collections of this work are preserved and exhibited by the National Art Museum of Ukraine, the Dnipropetrovsk Historical Museum named after Dmytro Yavornytskyi, and the Ukrainian Center of Folk Culture "Ivan Honchar Museum".

Gallery

Cossack Mamay in art

Literature 

 No End to Cossack Kin - a novel by Olexandr Ilchenko.
 Mamay - a historical verse novel by Leonid Gorlach.
 The Cossack Mamay Myth - collection of poems by Ihor Kalynets.

Movie 
In 2003, director Oles Sanin made the film Mamay at the Oleksandr Dovzhenko National Film Studio.

Music 
In music, the image of Cossack Mamay was reflected in the songs of contemporary Ukrainian bands Komu Vnyz, and Vopli Vidoplyasova.

Street art 
During the Revolution of Dignity, the artist Mykola Goncharov recreated the image of Cossack Mamaiya in graffiti and posters of the series "All you need is love", replacing the kobza with a Kalashnikov rifle, and the damask with a lit Molotov cocktail.

Cossack Mamay coin 
On the 1997 coin minted by National Bank of Ukraine, Cossack Mamay is dressed in a rich coat with fur and sits with his legs crossed, smoking a pipe and playing a kobza. Traditional elements of Cossack military life are around Mamay: a horse with rich harness, tied to a spear with a flag planted into the ground; a green oak tree with a sabre hanging from it; a pistol and a stone powder case; Turkish kalpak (high hat), and a bottle of okovyta (Ukrainian for aqua vitae).

The coin edge has the inscriptions: (Cossack Mamay) – at the left and (Knight of Freedom and Honor) – at the right. On top, these inscriptions are separated with a small flag at the spear point and, underneath, a conventionalized guelder-rose spray.

The Mamay coin is from the "Heroes of the Cossack Age" series, Ukrainian commemorative and jubilee coins.

See also 
 History of the Cossacks
 Zaporizhian Host

References

 Бушак С. М. Сміхова культура українського народу у творах «Козак Мамай» та «Запорожцях» Іллі Рєпіна // Скарбниця української культури. Збірка наукових праць. — Вип. 3. / Чернігівский історичний музей. – Чернігів: Сіверянська думка, 2002. — C. 72–79.
 Kozak Mamay. Amazing collection of images collected by one individual. Some paintings dating from the mid-17th century.

External links

 mamay.ch, Kozak Mamay. MAMAY'S ALIVE, HE JUST WAS THINKING.

Zaporozhian Host
Kobzarstvo
Coins of Ukraine
Ukrainian folklore
National symbols of Ukraine
Fictional Cossacks
Fictional musicians